The Roman Catholic Diocese of Caxias do Maranhão is a suffragan Latin diocese in the Ecclesiastical province of the Metropolitan of São Luís do Maranhão in northeastern Brazil.

Its cathedral episcopal see is Catedral de Nossa Senhora dos Remédios, dedicated to the Virgin of Los Remedios, in the city of Caxias (do Maranhão), in Maranhão state.

History 
 Established on 22 July 1939 as Diocese of Caxias do Maranhão, on territory split off from its Metropolitan, the Archdiocese of São Luís do Maranhão
 It lost territory repeatedly : on 1954.12.20 to establish the then Territorial Prelature of Santo Antônio de Balsas and in 1967 to enlarge the same Territorial Prelature (now Diocese of Balsas, in the same province).

Statistics 
As per 2015, it pastorally served 825,000 Catholics (96.9% of 851,000 total) on 34,449 km² in 23 parishes and 135 missions with 25 priests (23 diocesan, 2 religious), 14 deacons, 48 lay religious (6 brothers, 42 sisters) and 15 seminarians.

Episcopal ordinaries 
(all Roman rite)

Suffragan Bishops of Caxias do Maranhão 
 Luís Gonzaga da Cunha Marelim, Congregation of the Mission (C.M., Lazarists) (19 July 1941 - retired 18 February 1981), died 1991; no previous prelature
 Auxiliary Bishop: Cândido Julio Bampi, Capuchin Franciscans (O.F.M. Cap.) (1957.01.18 – death 1978.07.07); (also previously) Titular Bishop of Tlos (1936.06.27 – 1978.07.07), initially as only Bishop-Prelate of then Territorial Prelature of Vacaria (now a diocese, Brazil) (1936.06.27 – 1957.01.18)
 Jorge Tobias de Freitas (15 March 1981 - 7 November 1986), next Bishop of Nazaré (Brazil) (1986.11.07 – retired 2006.07.26)
 Luís d’Andrea, O.F.M. Conv. (born Italy) (29 October 1987 - retired 19 March 2010), died 2012
 Vilson Basso, Priests of the Sacred Heart (S.C.I.) (19 March 2010 – 2017.04.19), next Bishop of Imperatriz (Brazil) (2017.04.19 – ...).
 Sebastião Lima Duarte (2017.12.20 – ...), previously Bishop of Viana (Brazil) (2010.07.07 – 2017.12.20).

See also 
 List of Catholic dioceses in Brazil

Sources and external links 
 GCatholic.org, with Google map - data for all sections
 Catholic Hierarchy

Roman Catholic dioceses in Brazil
Religious organizations established in 1939
Roman Catholic Ecclesiastical Province of São Luís do Maranhão
Roman Catholic dioceses and prelatures established in the 20th century
1939 establishments in Brazil